Dietmar Friedhoff (born 18 June 1966) is a German politician for the populist Alternative for Germany (AfD) and since 2017 member of the Bundestag.

Life and politics

Friedhoff was born 1966 in the West German city of Hagen and studied electrical engineering and became a degreed engineer.

Friedhoff entered the newly founded AfD in 2013 and became member of the bundestag in 2017.

Friedhoff is considered to be part of the far right-wing of his party in his home state Lower Saxony

Friedhoff denies the scientific consensus on climate change and polemicized against energy transition.

References

Living people
1966 births
People from Hagen
Members of the Bundestag 2017–2021
Members of the Bundestag 2021–2025
Members of the Bundestag for the Alternative for Germany